The SNCAC Chardonneret (sometimes known as the Aérocentre Chardonneret) were a short series of 1940s French three- and four-seat cabin monoplanes with the same wings and general layout but with different engines.

Design and development

The name Chardonneret was applied to the three completed examples of the first post-war designs from the Société Nationale de Constructions Aéronautiques du Centre (SNCAC) company at Bourges. The NC.832, NC.840 and NC.841 trio differed chiefly in their engines and the number of people they could hold. The Chardonnerets were all high-wing, braced cabin monoplanes. The NC.832 was powered by a  four cylinder inline inverted air-cooled Régnier 4E.O engine and carried three. It had a tail wheel undercarriage and first flew on 3 November 1946. The other two were both four-seaters. The NC.840 had a  Renault 4Pei engine of similar configuration to the Régnier and a tricycle wheel undercarriage. The NC.841 had a  Mathis 175H radial engine and a tail wheel undercarriage. Although the aircraft did not sell, the experience was used in the tail wheel landing gear NC.850.

Variants
Date from:Gaillard (1990), p. 49
NC.832
Régnier 4E.O powered, three seat, tail wheel undercarriage, one built. 
NC.840
Renault 4Pei powered, four seat, tricycle undercarriage, one built. 
NC.841
Mathis 175H powered, four seat, tail wheel undercarriage, one built.

Specifications (NC.840)

References

Notes

Bibliography

 
 
 

084
1940s French civil utility aircraft
High-wing aircraft
Aircraft first flown in 1946